The Cameron Art Museum, formerly known as St. John's Museum of Art, was established in 1962 in downtown Wilmington, North Carolina in the 1804 Masonic Lodge building. The museum operated successfully in the downtown area for forty years and, eventually, outgrew its space. In 2001, the museum was relocated to the intersection of Independence and 17th Streets, changing its name to the Cameron Art Museum. The museum's new facilities allowed for the construction of three exhibition areas along with a lecture and reception hall. In addition, it provided space for outdoor exhibits, a clay studio, and an arts education center.

History of the current museum
Louise Wells Cameron was a volunteer at the original museum for 35 years and her husband, Bruce B. Cameron, had served on the museum board of directors. In 1999, the Bruce B. Cameron Foundation initiated the endowment campaign for a new museum with a $4,000,000 donation, and the children of the Camerons donated the land that the museum now sits on. The board of directors voted to name the new museum after Louise Wells Cameron.

Exhibitions
The Cameron Art Museum offers rotating exhibitions of historical and contemporary significance. The museum's permanent collection is composed of work by international, national, and local artists and covers a variety of disciplines.

Civil War battle site
The Cameron Art Museum's new location on Independence Street is home to the Civil War site of the Battle of Forks Road fought on February 20, 1865. The Confederate loss at the Battle of Forks Road, directly following the Fall of Fort Fisher, marked the beginning of the end for the Confederacy. The loss at Forks Road placed the Cape Fear Port in the hands of the Union cutting off supply lines to General Robert E. Lee in Northern Virginia and leading to the final surrender of the Confederate Army. The museum grounds are lined with Confederate revetments built during the Battle of Forks Road and every year the museum commemorates the lives lost on its property with a re-enactment of the battle followed by lectures, workshops, and artillery demonstrations.

School
The Museum School at the Cameron Art Museum offers a range of beginning and master classes, for children and adults, some of which can include CEU credit through New Hanover County Schools. Students of the Museum School have instructor-guided access to the museum's exhibitions and select objects in the museum's permanent collection not on view, and access to the museum's non-circulating art library numbering over 2000 publications and monographs. Additionally, the School creates employment opportunities for area artists and instructors.

References

External links 
 Cameron Art Museum official website

Art museums and galleries in North Carolina
Buildings and structures in Wilmington, North Carolina
Museums in New Hanover County, North Carolina
1964 establishments in North Carolina
Art museums established in 1964